Tiền Giang is a province in the Mekong Delta region of southern Vietnam.

The province was formed in February 1976, by the merger of Định Tường and Gò Công provinces.

Tiền Giang has an advantage of being located between two important economic regions – the Southern Key Economic Zone (SKEZ) and the Mekong Delta. The province is a gateway to Ho Chi Minh City (HCMC) and other eastern provinces as well as those of the Mekong Delta through its system of  road, one expressway, four National Roads (1, 30, 50 and 60).

Tiền Giang borders Long An province and HCMC to the north, Đồng Tháp province to the west, Bến Tre and Vĩnh Long province to the south, and the East Sea to the east. Mỹ Tho City, acting the leading role of socioeconomic and politic center of Tiền Giang, is the major junction of education, culture and tourism for nearby provinces.

Geography
The climate here is clearly divided into two main seasons, namely wet season and dry season and the average temperature is about 27 °C, all of which help to create a diverse ecosystem. From the 17th century a lot of Vietnamese people migrated from Ngu Quang to Tiền Giang province to reclaim this deserted area, which was full of dangerous animals, turned it into vast rice fields and luxuriant orchards and built wealthy villages there. There are a variety of ecosystems such as those at sea, canals, mounds and Đồng Tháp Mười depression, each of them has typical animals and plants, which creates a variety for not only landscape but also culture for this place. Tien Giang is also famous for the following specialties: fruits and my tho noodles. The special fruits that you need to try at least once when coming to Tien Giang are durian and blacksmith's milk, in addition to jackfruit, rambutan, pineapple...

Overall, thanks to its geographic location, economic condition, road and waterway transportation, Tiền Giang province has various advantages in using natural resources, developing goods production, expanding consumption market for its products, reinforcing its ability of cooperation and exchange in terms of economics, culture and tourism with other provinces in the region, especially Ho Chi Minh City and the Southern Key Economic Zone.

Its current terrain surface and land was created by the accumulation of Mekong river silt during the development process of the modern delta in the marine regression period from the mid-Holocene (about 5,000 – 4,500 years to the present), which is also called new silt. In general, because the land surface is new silt which is rich in cat dirt and organic matters; the altitude of topography surface is relatively low. Its force-bearing ability for construction is not high. Therefore, ground leveling need to be done and construction projects need to be reinforced. Deep layers are fairly rich in sand and have better geological characteristics for construction. However, the arrangement of layers is very complex and some layers with bad geological characteristics for construction mingle with good ones. Therefore, it is necessary to carefully study them before the construction of large scale or heavy load, etc. is carried out. The whole region does not have a clear slope direction but there are several zones whose terrain is lower or higher than the general terrain.

Climate

Tiền Giang province is in the climate zone of Mekong Delta – the tropical monsoon climate zone whose temperature is high and stable all year round. It is clearly divided into two seasons: the rainy season is from May to November which is at the same time with Southwestern monsoon and the dry season is from December to April of the following year  which is at the same time with Northeastern monsoon.

Administrative divisions
Tiền Giang is subdivided into 11 district-level sub-divisions:

 8 districts:

 Cái Bè
 Cai Lậy
 Châu Thành
 Chợ Gạo
 Gò Công Đông
 Gò Công Tây
 Tân Phú Đông
 Tân Phước

 2 district-level towns:

 Cai Lậy (newly created since 2013)
 Gò Công

 1 provincial city:
 Mỹ Tho (capital)

They are further subdivided into seven commune-level towns (or townlets), 144 communes and 22 wards.

Economy
If the Mekong Delta is dubbed Vietnam's fruit kingdom, Tiền Giang should be called “the kingdom of the fruits” since it has so many fruit brands such as Lò Rèn Vĩnh Kim star apple, Hòa Lộc mango and Tân Phước pineapple, Prime Minister Nguyễn Xuân Phúc said. It is up to the province's leadership and enterprises to make it possible for Tiền Giang to acquire geographical indications for fruits in the country and Southeast Asia, he said. The province has 73,000 ha of orchards, the largest in the country, which yield around 1.4 million tonnes of fruits a year. Besides hailing local authorities’ efforts to help enterprises overcome difficulties and achieve socioeconomic growth, the PM also instructed them to promptly address issues that could hinder development, such as speeding up land acquisition for businesses. The Government would always assist the province with infrastructure development to help it achieve its socioeconomic targets and guarantee that the legal rights of enterprises and investors in the province are protected, Nguyễn Xuân Phúc said.

Secretary of the provincial Party Committee Nguyễn Văn Danh said the locality will pay attention to marine economic development based on green growth and biodiversity conservation. The province will focus on restructuring the marine economy, developing science-technology and marine human resources, protecting the environment and coping with climate change and rising sea levels, Danh, who is also Chairman of the provincial People's Council said. It aims to reduce the number of inshore fishing vessels by 30 percent and establish a chain of connectivity from supplying materials to transportation of products, processing and sales. In addition, it will develop brackish water aquaculture by applying environmentally friendly technology.

According to Tiền Giang Industry and Trade Sector, the goal for 2016 is to focus on attracting investment by creating the favorable conditions for implementing well investment projects, and effectively employing existing facilities network of the sector. In addition, more efforts will be put on supporting and creating favorable condition as well as promptly alleviating difficulties for enterprises to boost provincial production and business. Alongside, restructure of the industry sector should be well done, focusing on developing industrial products with a competitive advantage, supporting industry, high technology industry and industrial products served for the development of agriculture and rural areas.

Tourism
The Mekong Delta province of Tiền Giang has divided itself into three economic zones to create spillover effects on the tourism sector, said the province's chairman, Le Van Huong, at the Culture, Sports and Tourism Festival 2019 there on January 11. In the western region of the province, the outlying district of Cái Bè has been regarded as a driving force, thanks to its Đông Hòa Hiệp ancient village festival. The central urban economic zone, according to Huong, is aimed at raising the quality of tourism services in Thới Sơn Islet of Mỹ Tho City, together with the development of a pedestrian area along the Tiền River, and a night food market. Afterwards, the development of tourism in Tân Thành Beach of Gò Công Đông District will be associated with cultural relics in Gò Công Town and Ngang Islet of Tân Phú Đông District, along with improvements in Truong Dinh Temple. The aim is to form a festival center of the zone. In 2019, the province targets 2.1 million tourists, including 850,000 foreigners, and 1.14 trillion VND in tourism revenue.

According to VnExpress, there are four unmissable places to visit in Tiền Giang province:
Cái Bè Floating market
The market is located in the area where the Tiền River borders three provinces: Tiền Giang, Vĩnh Long and Bến Tre.
Dong Tam Snake Farm
Vinh Trang temple
This is the largest Buddhist site in the province, built in the 19th century, and covering an area of two hectares with many large Buddha statues and beautiful gardens. The unique architecture of the temple is a combination of both Asian and European styles.
Thoi Son Island
The 1,200 hectare island is located in the lower section of the Tiền River. It has been a popular eco-tourism site since the 1990s. Today, it welcomes hundreds of tourists and visitors every day. The paths through the island is lined with fruit trees, including plums, nipa palms and mangoes.

Notable people from Tiền Giang
Empress Dowager Từ Dũ (1810–1902), mother of the Nguyễn dynasty's Emperor Tự Đức.
Empress Nam Phương (1914–1963), consort of Emperor Bảo Đại, the second and last empress consort of the Nguyễn dynasty.
Nguyễn Hữu Huân (1830–1975), a scholar and leader of an anti-French colonialist movement in Cochinchina.
Nguyễn Thị Thập (1908–1996), Deputy Chairwoman of the National Assembly of Vietnam (1960–75), and Chairwoman of the Women's Federation of Vietnam (1956–74).
Trương Mỹ Hoa (1945-), Vice President of Vietnam (2002–07), Deputy Chairwoman of the National Assembly of Vietnam (1997–2002), Chairwoman of the Women's Federation of Vietnam (1992–98).
Lê Thanh Hải (1950-), member of the Politburo of the Communist Party of Vietnam, Secretary of the Ho Chi Minh City's Communist Party Committee (2006-date).
Viet Khang (1973-), Vietnamese songwriter and singer with songs that highly criticized the Socialist Republic of Vietnam.
Nguyen Minh Phong, Vietnam's Next Top Model (cycle 7) top five alumnus.
Phương Dung (1946-), Vietnamese country singer
Trần Văn Khê (1921-2015), Vietnamese musicologist, academic, writer, teacher and performer of traditional music.

References

External links
Official website of the Tiền Giang government

 
Provinces of Vietnam